Film Crash is a California-based annual film festival and screenplay competition, programming independent, animated,  experimental, low-budget and underground films. The programmers award prizes.

History
In 1985 film director Matthew Harrison launched a floating film screening series in the East Village, Manhattan, adopting the name Film Crash and its associated logo in early 1988. He was joined later that year by film directors Karl Nussbaum and Scott Saunders.

Expansion
Film Crash grew, playing in venues such as 124 Ridge Street Gallery, Performance Space 122, R.A.P.P. Arts Center, Angelika Film Center, Shooting Gallery, São Paulo Museum of Image and Sound, Hirshhorn Museum in Washington D.C. and Heliotrope Theater in Los Angeles. In 2014 Film Crash was held in Mid-City, Los Angeles on October 22. In 2015 a Screenplay Competition component was added to Film Crash. The 2022 Film Crash festival and screenplay competition was held at the Laemmle Royal Theatre in West Los Angeles on October 15.

Theater collaboration
As a collective of filmmakers, Film Crash also collaborated with the experimental theater group Ridge Theater , producing and directing films for several theater productions including Jack Benny at La Mama in 1988 and The Manson Family opera at Lincoln Center for the Performing Arts in 1990.

Film production
In 2002 Film Crash presented Mark Christensen's debut feature film Box Head Revolution. In 2006 Film Crash produced Ben Rodkin's debut feature film Big Heart City starring Seymour Cassel and Shawn Andrews.

Film Crash Programs

2022
 October 15, 2022 - Laemmle Royal, West Los Angeles

2021
 October 16, 2021 - Laemmle Royal, West Los Angeles

2020
 October 31, 2020 - Online event (due to COVID-19)

2019
 October 12, 2019 - Laemmle Royal , West Los Angeles

2018
 October 13, 2018 - Laemmle Royal , West Los Angeles
{{Unbulleted list |Illusion, Directed by Yedan Zhu, First Prize Student Animated Film
|The Midpoint of a Very Long Story, Directed by Ertug Tufekcioglu, First Prize Drama
|My Heart is a Lure, Directed by Patrick Moser, First Prize Experimental Film
|Move, Directed by David Stenseth, First Prize Student Documentary
|Voice, Directed by Takeshi Kushida, First Prize Experimental Drama
|College Nomad, Directed by Albert Rano, First Prize Documentary
|The Hyacinth Girl, Julia Rock, Best Actor
|The Hyacinth Girl, Directed by Marielle Heydt, First Prize Best Movie
|Until We Reach The Sun, Directed by Daisy Dickinson, First Prize Animated Film

|Did You Hear?, Written by Joseph Harrison, First Prize Romantic Comedy Screenplay
|The Color Of Evil, Written by Connie Wilson, First Prize Horror Screenplay
|The Cottages, Written by John Darbonne, First Prize Web/New Media Screenplay
|Back Home, Written by Matthew Baker, First Prize Comedy Feature Screenplay
|Egalité, Written by Michael Head, First Prize 1-Hour Drama Pilot
|Til Death, Written by Alexandra Marshall, First Prize Dramatic Short Screenplay
|Paradise Pond, Written by Lorraine Portman, First Prize Thriller Screenplay
|The Mushroom King, Written by Steve Trebilcock, First Prize Action Adventure Screenplay
|Delivery Girl, Written by Katherine Grant Krieger, First Prize Dramatic Feature Screenplay
|My Life With Cats'', Written by Bear Kosik, First Prize 1/2-Hour Sitcom Pilot}}

2017
 October 14, 2017 - Laemmle Royal , West Los Angeles2016
 October 22, 2016 - MiMoDa Studio , Los Angeles March 19, 1988 - 124 Ridge Street Gallery, New York City February 18, 1988 - 124 Ridge Street Gallery, New York City February 12, 1988 - Minor Injury Gallery, New York City January 22, 1988 - 124 Ridge Street Gallery, New York City1987
 November 21, 1987 - RAPP Arts Center , New York City November 14, 1987 - 124 Ridge Street Gallery, New York City November 1, 1987 - Gas Station 2B, New York City September 10, 1987 - 124 Ridge Street Gallery, New York City July 10, 1987 - RAPP Arts Center, New York City May 16, 1987 - RAPP Arts Center, New York City May 1, 1987 - 124 Ridge Street Gallery, New York City March 13, 1987 - 124 Ridge Street Gallery, New York City February 27, 1987 - RAPP Arts Center, New York City1986
 December 12, 1986 - 124 Ridge Street Gallery, New York City September 27, 1986 - 124 Ridge Street Gallery, New York City July 10, 1986 - 124 Ridge Street Gallery, New York City June 14, 1986 - 124 Ridge Street Gallery, New York City April 12, 1986 - 124 Ridge Street Gallery, New York City May 17, 1986 - 124 Ridge Street Gallery, New York City March 15, 1986 - 124 Ridge Street Gallery, New York City1985
 December 6, 1985 - 124 Ridge Street Gallery, New York City June 21, 1985 - Club Neither Nor, New York City February 6, 1985 - 130 East 7 Street, New York City'''

References

External links
 Film Crash website
 Ridge Theater website

Festivals in New York City
Film festivals in Los Angeles
Experimental film festivals
Underground film festivals